Ellie White  (born March 6, 1989) is an English comedy actress. She is best known for playing Princess Beatrice of York in the British royal family parody, The Windsors (2016–2020), and Katia in the sitcom, Stath Lets Flats (2018–2021).

In 2022, Ellie co-wrote and starred in the BBC sketch show, Ellie & Natasia, alongside her comedy partner Natasia Demetriou. On 8 February, 2023 the show won Best TV Sketch Show at the Comedy.co.uk Awards 2022.

Early life and career
Ellie White is from Oxford, England. Her father is journalist Jim White. She attended the University of Bristol, and was a member of the Bristol Revunions,  graduating in 2010.

White's career started in 2013, doing comedy stand-up at the Edinburgh Festival Fringe, where the comedy line up also included Aisling Bea and Romesh Ranganathan. After the festival, White landed her first TV appearance on the Channel 4 TV series Jamie Demetriou's Comedy Blaps, and on BBC Three's Live at the Electric, as well as BBC Radio 4's Fresh From the Fringe. In 2015, White landed a regular role in series 2 of House of Fools.

In 2019, White teamed up with long-time stand-up comedy partner Natasia Demetriou to make critically acclaimed comedy sketch pilot Ellie & Natasia for the BBC. Since 2016, White has portrayed the character of Princess Beatrice of York for three seasons of the spoof royal comedy The Windsors, alongside actress Celeste Dring, who plays her royal sister Princess Eugenie.

In 2020, White played the main role of Cathy in the BBC comedy series The Other One, and starred alongside Lee Mack in the BBC sitcom Semi-Detached. 

In 2021, White played a voice only role as "Radio" in the Sky One television comedy series Bloods about two paramedics. In 2022, she appeaered in The Dumping Ground, We Are Not Alone and The Witchfinder (TV series).

Filmography

Film

Television

References

External links

United Agents - Ellie White
United Voices - Ellie White

Living people
21st-century English actresses
1989 births
Actors from Oxford
Actresses from Oxfordshire
Alumni of the University of Bristol
English film actresses
English television actresses